Trailblazer was an American rocket used between 1961 and 1967 for research on atmospheric reentry

Trailblazer 1 was launched on 21 April 1961

Trailblazer 2 was launched on 1962 May  6, 1966 Mar 18 and 1967 Feb 14

References 
 Description and Performance of Three Trailblazer II
 Trailblazer 2 Rocket Tests on the Reentry Plasma Sheath
 JSR Launch Logs, Jonathan C. McDowell

Sounding rockets